Papilio rutulus, the western tiger swallowtail, is a swallowtail butterfly belonging to the Papilionidae family. The species was first described by Hippolyte Lucas in 1852.

Like the other tiger swallowtails, the western tiger swallowtail was formerly classified in genus Pterourus, but modern classifications all agree in placing them within Papilio.

Distribution
This common species is present in western North America. The normal range of the western tiger swallowtail covers much of western North America, from British Columbia to North Dakota in the north to Baja California and New Mexico in the south. Individuals occasionally turn up east of this range; in eastern North America, though, it is replaced by the similar eastern tiger swallowtail, Papilio glaucus.

Habitat
These butterflies are frequently seen in urban parks and gardens, as well as in rural woodlands and riparian areas.

Description

These large butterflies are brightly colored. The wings are yellow with black stripes and blue and orange spots near their tail. They have the "tails" on the hindwings that are often found in swallowtails.

Young caterpillars resemble bird droppings, and as they molt, they eventually turn bright green, with a pair of large yellow eyespots with black and blue pupils. The chrysalis is green in summer and dark brown in winter, and looks like a piece of wood.

Biology
Butterflies emerge from winter chrysalids between February and May, the date depending on the temperature, so they are seen earlier in the more southerly and more coastal parts of their range. They are very active butterflies, rarely seen at rest. The adult females lay up to a hundred eggs in total. The eggs are deep green, shiny, and spherical. They are laid singly, on the undersides of leaves.

The caterpillars emerge about four days later. They can feed on the leaves of a variety of trees, and the predominant food plant varies across their range; trees commonly used include cottonwood, willow, quaking aspen, and many others.

The caterpillars molt five times, eventually reaching a length up to 5 cm before pupating. In summer, the butterfly can emerge as quickly as 15 days after the caterpillar pupated, but when the caterpillar pupates in the fall, the butterfly does not emerge until the spring.

The males often congregate, along with other species of swallowtail, at pools and along streams and rivers; they drink from the water and mud, extracting minerals, as well as moisture.

Gallery

See also
 Canadian tiger swallowtail

References
USGS treatment
Canadian Biodiversity Information Facility

rutulus
Butterflies of North America
Fauna of the California chaparral and woodlands
Butterflies described in 1852
Taxa named by Hippolyte Lucas
Articles containing video clips